is a train station on the Hanshin Railway Kobe Kosoku Line and the Hankyu Railway Kobe Kosoku Line in Chūō-ku, Kobe, Hyōgo Prefecture, Japan.

Lines
Hanshin Railway Kobe Kosoku Line
Hankyu Railway Kobe Kosoku Line
Kobe Rapid Transit Railway Co., Ltd. owns the tracks and facilities of those railway lines as "the Tozai Line" of the Category-3 operator, and Hanshin and Hankyu operates trains running on the line as Category-2 operators.

The station is also connected to the following stations.
West Japan Railway Company
Tokaido Line, Sanyo Line (JR Kobe Line) – Kobe Station
Kobe Municipal Subway
Kaigan Line – Harborland Station

Layout
The station has two island platforms with four tracks underground.

History
The station opened on 7 April 1968.

Damage to the station was caused by the Great Hanshin earthquake in 1995.

Station numbering was introduced on 1 April 2014.

References 

Railway stations in Hyōgo Prefecture
Railway stations in Japan opened in 1968